National Geographic Orion (previously known as MS Orion and MY Orion) is operated by New York City-based Lindblad Expeditions - National Geographic.

History
Built by Cassens shipyard in Germany for the Marshall Islands registered company Explorer Maritime, with technical management by the Greek-based company Helios Shipping, the Orion was originally operated, albeit for a short time, by US-based cruise operator Travel Dynamics International (TDI). TDI had operated the vessel in the Antarctic and the Arctic and many points in between, including the Great Lakes and the Amazon River.

Orion Expedition Cruises (OEC), since absorbed by Lindblad, then entered a long-term agreement to lease the vessel, handing it over to OEC in the Tahitian port of Papeete in March 2005 for transfer to Australia. OEC quickly expanded and further developed the expedition cruise market in the region and gained international recognition.

In May 2008, OEC announced the purchase of the company by KSL Capital Partners, a Denver-based private equity company specialising in high end travel and leisure enterprises. OEC now plans to expand beyond its one-ship operation in the Oceania region through the building of new ships and/or other acquisitions.

On the evening of 20 January 2013, the ship rescued a round-the-world yachtsman, Alain Delord, from his liferaft located 487 nautical miles SSW of Hobart (S49.47.93 E144.20.47) in the Southern Ocean. He had abandoned his yacht after it lost its mast and its hull was damaged in rough weather. The ship, with 100 passengers and 80 crew on board, was on its way from Antarctica to the world heritage-listed Macquarie Island when it responded to the call for help. The captain of the Orion, Mike Taylor, undertook the 1500 km rescue in moderate to rough seas from Antarctica's Commonwealth Bay. In a race against time, the ship successfully tracked the sailor's emergency radio beacon and effected the rescue with just an hour of sunlight left.

On 5 March 2013 it was announced that Orion Expeditions had been acquired by US-based small-ship operator Lindblad Expeditions, which owns five ships and charters a further five and operates cruises to a variety of destinations. CFMF holds a 60 percent interest in Lindblad Expeditions.

The MV Orion was renamed National Geographic Orion in March 2014, and joined the fleet-owned National Geographic Endeavour, MS National Geographic Explorer, National Geographic Islander, National Geographic Sea Bird and National Geographic Sea Lion, along with their chartered vessels Delfin II, Jahan, Lord of the Glens, Oceanic Discoverer and Sea Cloud.

Current operations
Following OEC’s takeover by Lindblad Expeditions announced in March 2013, it was announced that Lindblad intended maintain cruises to Orions destinations of Indonesia, Borneo, Papua New Guinea, New Zealand and the Kimberleys. In March 2014 itineraries to more easterly and remote Pacific islands were added. It was to be equipped with an underwater remotely operated vehicle (ROV), capacity for up to 24 scuba divers and oceangoing kayaks, with cruises to be accompanied by a National Geographic photographer.

In a statement in January 2015, Lindblad surprised the industry by announcing that Orion would be based in Europe for the northern summer from 2016, ceasing Southern Hemisphere winter operations.

On December 27, 2016, the ship suffered catastrophic main engine failure approx. 200 miles south of the Beagle channel, on the way from the Antarctic peninsula to Ushuaia. There were no injuries, and the ship arrived safely to Ushuaia a day later than planned using its back-up engine. Lindblad canceled the December 27 and all January 2017 sailings of Orion.

Further Vessel SpecificationsHull: Ice-reinforced for voyages in the Arctic and AntarcticIce Class: E3 (Germanischer Lloyd)Engines: Mak; 8M25; 3,265HPStabilisers: Blohm & Voss, retractable fin stabilisersClassification: Germanischer Lloyd; 100 A5 E3 Passenger Ship; MC E3 AUTRegulations: Orion is built according to the latest international safety regulations, and the USL code in a 1a survey including those of the U.S. Coast Guard, U.S. Public Health, Canadian Arctic Shipping, St. Lawrence Seaway and to Lloyds.Additional Craft: 10 Zodiac Heavy Duty MK5 Inflatables, 10 Sea Kayaks, 2 Jet Boats and a Fishing Boat

Sister Vessels
While she is essentially a unique ship, she was preceded by two slightly smaller but very similar vessels built at the Cassens Emden shipyard in Germany.

 Sun BayThe 88.5 m, 96 passenger Sun Bay was launched in 2001 and was originally operated by Sun Bay Cruises in the Bahamas before being transferred to Royal Caribbean Cruises Ltd. and is currently operated by their Celebrity Cruises division as Celebrity Xpedition in the Galapagos IslandsSun Bay II'''The 88.5m, 96 passenger Sun Bay II was launched in 2002 and as with the Sun Bay was originally operated by Sun Bay Cruises in the Bahamas. By 2002 the Sun Bay II had been renamed Corinthian and was operated by American cruise company Travel Dynamics International. By 2004 the vessel had passed to private ownership and was briefly named the Constellation; after its latest refit it is currently operated as the Lauren L''.

References

External links
 Official website
  Cassens-Werft Shipyard homepage
  Downloadable PDF specifications for MV Orion

Expedition cruising
Cruise ships
Ships built in Emden